Edgar Murphy may refer to:

 Edgar Gardner Murphy (1869–1913), American clergyman and author
 Edgar O. Murphy (1878–1959), mayor of Farmingdale, New Jersey